Tin Can Mike Lake (also, Mike Lake and Murphy Lake) is a lake in Lake County, Minnesota.  Tin Can Mike Lake lies at an elevation of 1306 feet (398 m).

References

Minnesota DNR: Lake information report

Lakes of Minnesota
Lakes of Lake County, Minnesota